Ann Gloria Daniel (born c. 1934) is a beauty queen from Dade-City, Florida and she competed in the Miss Florida pageant and the Miss America pageant.

Biography
Daniel won the Miss Florida 1954 title in the state pageant. She went on to place first runner-up in Miss America 1955 pageant. For her talent portion of the competition, she demonstrated her skills as an accordionist.  She still plays the accordion to this day.

Education
Daniel attended the Florida Southern College for her undergraduate education.

References

External links
Profile for Ann Daniel
Official photo

1930s births
University of Florida alumni
Living people
People from Dade City, Florida
Miss America 1950s delegates
Miss America Preliminary Swimsuit winners
20th-century American people